The 2017 end-of-year rugby union internationals, also known as the November internationals, or autumn internationals in the Northern Hemisphere, were international rugby union matches in 2017.

Rugby Championship winners New Zealand travelled to France for two matches (one an uncapped XV match), Scotland and Wales. Argentina faced England, Ireland and Italy - with the latter two countries also hosting South Africa. The Springboks also faced their June test series opposition, France, whom they had beaten 3–0, before ending their tour in Wales, after the international window. Having beaten New Zealand in the third Bledisloe Cup Test match in October, Australia travelled to play Wales, England and Scotland, the latter of whom had beaten the Wallabies in Sydney during the June internationals.

Four Tier 2 nations faced Tier 1 opposition during the international window. Ireland and Italy hosted Fiji, the first time since 2009 for Ireland. England and Scotland played host to Samoa. France and Wales hosted historic matches against Tier 2 opposition, with Wales playing Georgia for the first time and France hosting Japan for the first time in the professional era; Japan's previous visit to France came in 1973. For Japan this was the third time in five years that they had played two Tier 1 opponents during the November tests, having already hosted Australia prior to their away match against France.

Tier 2 and Tier 3
After defeating Canada and the United States away earlier in the year, Georgia played host to the same opposition at home. Romania took on Pacific opposition, hosting Samoa, and playing Samoa, for the first time since 1989, before playing host to Tonga after losing for the first time against them in 2015. For the second year in a row, Spain faced Tier 2 opposition from outside of Europe, facing Canada in what was the first meeting since they first played in 2010. As in previous November internationals, travelling Tier 2 nations faced each other at neutral venues in Europe. This year saw Japan face Tonga in Toulouse, while Fiji faced Canada in Narbonne. With Uruguay's 2019 Rugby World Cup qualifier play-offs taking place in February 2018, they embarked on a two-test series against Namibia as preparation. This was the first time since 2000 that the two nations has met, and the first time Namibia hosted the Los Teros.

Having won their two-test series against Brazil in November 2015 and November 2016, Germany faced Brazil for the third year in a row, this time in a one-off test match. Germany later went on to face Chile and the United States, in what were historic first ever matches between the respective nations. Brazil also faced historic opposition, playing Belgium and Spain for the first time.

Fixtures

Week 1

Notes:
 Sam Cane (New Zealand) earned his 50th test cap.
 This was the first time New Zealand had lost multiple tests in a calendar year since 2011. It was also the first time they had failed to win more than 2 tests since 2009.

Week 2

Notes:
 Asaeli Ai Valu, Kazuki Himeno, Fetuani Lautaimi, Sione Teaupa and Wimpie van der Walt (all Japan) and Matt Philip (Australia) made their international debuts.
 Ben McCalman (Australia) earned his 50th test cap.

Notes:
 New Zealand claimed the Killik Cup.

Week 3

Notes:
 Giorgi Kveseladze, Mirian Modebadze (both Georgia) and Josh Larsen (Canada) made their international debuts.
 This was Georgia largest winning margin over Canada.

Notes:
 Jayden Hayward, Giovanni Licata, Ian McKinley, Matteo Minozzi (all Italy), Semi Kunatani and Ropate Rinakama (both Fiji) made their international debuts.

Notes:
 Jamie Bhatti, Darryl Marfo, Chris Harris, George Turner (all Scotland), AJ Alatimu, Donald Brighouse, Melani Matavao and Josh Tyrell (all Samoa) made their international debut.

Notes:
 Sam Simmonds (England) and Sebastian Cancelliere (Argentina) made their international debuts.

Notes:
 Leon Brown, Sam Cross and Owen Watkin (all Wales) made their international debuts.
 Australia retained the James Bevan Trophy.	

Notes:
 Bundee Aki and Darren Sweetnam (both Ireland) made their international debuts.	
 Seán O'Brien (Ireland) earned his 50th test cap.
 This was Ireland's largest winning margin over South Africa, surpassing the 17-point margin set in 2006.	

Notes:
 Anthony Belleau, Judicaël Cancoriet, Raphael Chaume, Geoffrey Doumayrou, Paul Gabrillagues and Anthony Jelonch (all France) made their international debuts.
 Yoann Huget (France) earned his 50th test cap.
 New Zealand retain the Dave Gallaher Trophy.

Week 4

Notes:
 Nick Cording, Amin Hamzaoui, Vincent Hart (all Belgium) and Will Broderick (Brazil) made their international debuts.
 This was the first meeting between the two nations.
 This was Brazil's first victory on in Europe.

Notes:
 Joaquín Tuculet (Argentina) earned his 50th test cap.

Notes:
 Nelius Theron (Namibia) made his international debut.
 Gastón Mieres (Uruguay) earned his 50th test cap.
 This is the first time that Namibia has hosted Uruguay in a test match.
 This is Uruguay's largest winning margin over Namibia, surpassing the 11-point difference set in 2000.

Notes:
 Elliot Dee (Wales) made his international debut.
 This was the first meeting between the two nations.

Notes:
 Joan Losada (Spain) made his international debut.

Notes:
 Blake Enever (Australia) made his international debut.
 This is England's largest winning margin over Australia, surpassing the 17-point difference set in 2010.
 England retain the Cook Cup.
 England extend their winning run against Australia to five consecutive matches, equalling their previous winning run against them set between 2000 and 2003.
 Owen Farrell became England's all-time leading points scorer against Australia, surpassing Jonny Wilkinson's 114 points.
 Australian captain Michael Hooper's eighth international yellow card makes him the most yellow-carded player in test history.

Notes:
 Adam Preocanin, Hagen Schulte (both Germany) and Huluholo Moungaloa (United States) made their international debuts.
 This was the first meeting between the two nations.

Notes:
 Brandon Nansen (Samoa) made his international debut.

Notes:
 Koo Ji-won (Japan), Jethro Felemi, Onehunga Havili, Penikolo Latu, Fotu Lokotui, Sione Lolohea, George Taina, Shinnosuke Tu'umoto'oa, Sione Vailanu and Maama Vaipulu (all Tonga) made their international debuts.
 This was Japan's biggest winning margin over Tonga, surpassing the 27-point difference set in 1999.

Notes:
 Luke Hamilton and Byron McGuigan (both Scotland) made their international debuts.

Notes:
 Chris Farrell (Ireland) made his international debut.

Notes:
 Sébastien Taofifénua (France) and Dan du Preez (South Africa) made their international debuts.

Notes:
 Giorgi Chkhaidze (Georgia) earned his 100th test cap.

Week 5

Notes:
 Marcel Becker, Rafael Dutta, Sebastian Fromm, Gino Gennaro, Luke Haynes, Carsten Lang, Robert Lehmann, Tim Lichtenberg, Felix Martel, Stefan Mau, Senzo Ngubane, Robin Plümpe, Max Reinhard, Kain Rix and Benedikt Sabinarz (all Germany) made their international debuts.
 This was the first meeting between the two nations.

Notes:
 Renato Giammarioli (Italy) and Warrick Gelant (South Africa) made their international debuts.

Notes:
 Phil Burleigh (Scotland) and Taniela Tupou (Australia) made their international debuts.
 Stuart Hogg was named in the starting XV, but was injured in the warm-up.
 Sekope Kepu is the first Wallaby to be red-carded since Tevita Kuridrani in 2013.
 This is Scotland's largest winning margin over Australia, surpassing the nine-point margin set in 1981.
 This is the most points Scotland has ever scored against Australia.
 This is Scotland's first win over Australia in Scotland since 2009.
 This is the first time that Scotland has beaten Australia more than once in one calendar year.
 Scotland retain the Hopetoun Cup for the first time since 2012.

Notes:
 Jamie-Jerry Taulagi (Samoa) made his international debut.

Notes:
 Adrian Motoc, Kuselo Moyake (both Romania) and Leo Halavatau (Tonga) made their international debuts.

Notes:
 Ratunaisa Navuma (Fiji) made his international debut.
 Campese Ma'afu (Fiji) earned his 50th test cap.
 This is Fiji's largest winning margin over Canada, surpassing the 31-point difference set in 2000.

Notes:
 Rhys Priestland and Scott Williams (both Wales) earned their 50th test caps.

Notes:
 Adam Byrne (Ireland) made his international debut.	

Notes:
 This is the first draw between the two nations.
 Gabriel Lacroix and Sekou Macalou (both France) made their international debuts.
 This was the first rugby match at U Arena, which opened the previous month and became the new home of Top 14 side Racing 92 in December 2017.

Notes
 Hadleigh Parkes (Wales) and Lukhanyo Am and Louis Schreuder (both South Africa) made their international debuts.
 Wales retain the Prince William Cup.

See also
 2017 Cup of Nations
 2019 Rugby World Cup
 2017 mid-year rugby union internationals
 End of year rugby union tests
 Mid-year rugby union tests

References

2017
2017–18 in European rugby union
2017 in Oceanian rugby union
2017 in North American rugby union
2017 in South American rugby union
2017 in African rugby union
2017–18 in Japanese rugby union
End-of-year rugby union
End-of-year rugby union